Brandon William Cortés Bustos (born 26 June 2001) is an Argentine-Chilean professional footballer who plays as an attacking midfielder for Universidad de Chile, on loan from Boca Juniors.

Club career
Cortés is a product of the Boca Juniors youth set-up; signing in 2012 after spells with Juventud Unida de Barracas and Vélez Sarsfield. He was moved into the first-team by manager Gustavo Alfaro in 2018–19, with his first experience of senior football arriving on 2 April 2019 as he was an unused substitute in the Copa Libertadores against Athletico Paranaense. Cortés, who is of Chilean descent, subsequently made his professional bow days later, aged seventeen, in an away draw versus Aldosivi in the Primera División; he was substituted on in place of Sebastián Villa after eighty-three minutes.

After one further match for Boca, versus Río Cuarto's Estudiantes in the Copa Argentina, Cortés departed on loan in November 2020 to Universidad de Chile; penning terms until December 2021. He immediately made appearances later that month against Santiago Wanderers, Unión La Calera and Everton in the Primera División.

International career
Cortés, who is eligible to play for Chile or Argentina, trained with the Chile U17s ahead of the 2017 FIFA World Cup, though didn't make the final cut due to paperwork issues. In July 2019, Cortés was called up by the Argentina U18s for that year's L'Alcúdia International Tournament in Spain. Argentina beat Mauritania in match one, with Cortés netting a goal in a 4–1 win.

Career statistics
.

References

External links

2001 births
Living people
Footballers from Buenos Aires
Argentine sportspeople of Chilean descent
Citizens of Chile through descent
Naturalized citizens of Chile
Argentine footballers
Argentina youth international footballers
Association football midfielders
Argentine Primera División players
Chilean Primera División players
Boca Juniors footballers
Universidad de Chile footballers
Expatriate footballers in Chile